Herman is an unincorporated community in Summit Township, Butler County, Pennsylvania, United States. Its ZIP code is 16039 (PO Box).

Notes

Unincorporated communities in Butler County, Pennsylvania
Unincorporated communities in Pennsylvania